is a castle in Nagaokakyō, Kyoto, Japan.

History
This castle was constructed in 1339 by Hosokawa Yoriharu, a major samurai commander under Ashikaga Takauji, the founder of the Ashikaga shogunate. 

The area around the castle is a strategic foothold to defend Kyoto, the capital of Japan at that time, from western threats. During the Ōnin War, this castle was used as a castle of the western alliance and became occupied by Iwanari Tomomichi, a daimyō of the Miyoshi clan, during the Sengoku period. The castle fell to Oda Nobunaga in 1568, and was given to Hosokawa Fujitaka, who occupied it until 1579. 

At the battle of Yamazaki between Toyotomi Hideyoshi and Akechi Mitsuhide, following Mitsuhide's killing of Nobunaga, this castle's garrison collapsed, forcing Mitsuhide to flee to his death.

Access
Nagaokakyo Station of Tokaido Main Line

References

 Official Homepage of Nagaoka Tourist Bureau

Castles in Kyoto Prefecture
Former castles in Japan
Ruined castles in Japan
Miyoshi clan
Akechi clan